The rosy thrush-tanager (Rhodinocichla rosea) or rose-breasted thrush-tanager is a species of bird in the currently monotypic genus Rhodinocichla. It was formerly assigned to the family Thraupidae and more recently viewed as being of uncertain placement; a 2015 molecular study places it closest to the Calcariidae. Found in Colombia, Costa Rica, Mexico, Panama, and Venezuela, its natural habitats are subtropical or tropical dry forests, subtropical or tropical moist lowland forests, and heavily degraded former forest.

Description
The male is a distinctive bird with a long streak above the eye, pink in front of the eye and white behind. The upper parts are dark, brownish-black, the flanks are dusky grey and the underparts magenta, as is the leading edge of the wing. The female is generally similar to the male but the rosy-magenta is replaced by a deep ochre colour. The beak is long and slightly curved, resembling that of a mimid.

Distribution and habitat
The distribution in Central America and northern South America includes Mexico, Costa Rica, northern Venezuela and northern Colombia. Typical habitat is thick undergrowth in deciduous forests, secondary woodland, thickets and scrubland.

Ecology
The rosy thrush-tanager usually occurs singly or in pairs. It flits among low undergrowth or hops along on the ground, turning over the leaf litter with its beak. It is a shy, rather furtive bird and difficult to observe. It does, however, respond well if a recording of its voice is played to it; its song is a rich succession of clear notes, and is sometimes sung in duet, two birds alternating in its production. It is the only tanager known to sing in this way. The diet is a mixture of animal and vegetable matter. Breeding is reported to take place in July in Mexico and between January and September in Costa Rica.

Status
R. rosea has a wide range and is estimated by Partners in Flight to have a total population of fewer than 50,000 individuals. However, the population seems to be stable and the International Union for Conservation of Nature has assessed its conservation status as being of "least concern".

References

rosy thrush-tanager
Birds of Mexico
Birds of Panama
Birds of the Colombian Andes
Birds of the Sierra Nevada de Santa Marta
Birds of the Venezuelan Coastal Range
rosy thrush-tanager
Taxonomy articles created by Polbot